CCTV-15 is one of the official broadcasting channels of China Central Television launched on March 29, 2004. It aims to broadcast a diverse assortment of different music genres, including classical music, Chinese traditional and minority music, as well as popular music. It also has periodic music programs on famous classical or popular composers as well as music in movies. Available only on selected cable & satellite providers.

The startup sequence features scenes across the world, from Catholic churches to Chinese palaces, gardens and watertowns, a Spanish boulevard, Gothic, neo-classic, and classic architectures in Europe and children from across the world as well to a rendition of 茉莉花, a traditional Chinese song. This sequence shows the channel's value of broadcasting not only Chinese music, but international music as well as classic & modern music.

External links
 Official Site

China Central Television channels
Television channels and stations established in 2004
2004 establishments in China